Gloria Joan Skurzynski (born July 6, 1930) is an American writer of books for young people, including both fiction and non-fiction.

Early life and education
Gloria Joan Flister Skurzynski was born in Duquesne, Pennsylvania in 1930 to Aylmer Kearney Flister and Serena Decker Flister. Her father worked at a steel mill, while her mother worked as a telegraph operator. She grew up during the Great Depression. She was educated at Carlow University in 1948, which at that time was known as Mount Mercy College. She disliked school, however, and dropped out to work as a statistical clerk at the U.S. Steel in Pittsburgh from 1950 to 1952. She met Edward Joseph Skurzynski while working there, and they were married in December 1951. They went on to have five children, and later moved to Salt Lake City, Utah. Skurzynski and her husband Edward currently reside in Boise, Idaho.

Career
Skurzynski is the author of more than sixty books written for young readers. She became friends with Phyllis McGinley, poet who won a Pulitzer Prize in 1965. Through their correspondence, McGinley convinced Skurzynski to try professional writing. Skyrzynski's first professional writing attempt was rejected 58 times before her first publication made it into Teen Magazine. Skurzynski was also published in School and Library Journal magazines. It was reported that she was inspired by one of her daughter's poems in 1966 to become a free-lance writer.

In 1979, she became a professional writer, and shifted her focus to children's novels. Four Winds Press published her first children's novel, What Happened in Hamelin? in 1979. She is also the author of The Tempering (1983) and Good-bye, Billy Radish (1992).

In her writing, Skurzynski draws on her life experiences, including her father's stories and her own childhood in Pittsburgh. Many of her books include themes about national parks, astronomy, and animals.

Skurzynski is also the author of several non-fiction books. These include Bionic Parts for People: The Real Story of Artificial Organs and Replacement Parts which was published in 1978, and Are We Alone?: Scientists Search for Life in Space which was published in 2004. More recently, she collaborated with her daughter, Alane Ferguson to write a series of books for National Geographic Society called Mysteries in Our National Parks. To write these books, Skurzynski did most of the technical research on the subjects, while her daughter wrote the dialogue.

Before becoming a professional writer, Skurzynski was involved with the Girl Scouts of the USA. She wrote a play for them to perform in 1964 entitled The Golden Chain.

Awards
Skurzynski received an Outstanding Science Trade Book for Children award from the National Science Teachers Association (NSTA) in 1991. Later more of her books have received the same award. Her book Good-bye, Billy Radish was named the Best Book of the Year by the School Library Journal and was also awarded a Judy Lopez Memorial Book by the Women's National Book Association. In 2002, Skurzynski received two Golden Spur Awards from the Western Writers of America for Rockbuster. She was also awarded a Science Writing Award from the American Institute of Physics, as well as a Golden Kite Award. She was also the recipient of a Christopher Award from the Western Writers of America.

Selected works

Mysteries in Our National Parks

The Virtual War Chronologs
Virtual War (1997)
The Clones (2002)
The Revolt (2005)
The Choice (2006)

Others

References

Further reading
Contemporary Authors Online. The Gale Group, 2007. PEN (Permanent Entry Number):  0000091922.

External links

Archival materials
 The Gloria Skurzynski papers at the University of Pittsburgh
 Gloria Skurzynski papers, MSS 2330 at L. Tom Perry Special Collections, Harold B. Lee Library, Brigham Young University
Gloria Skurzynski Papers, 2002-2010, MSS 304 at Special Collections and Archives, Boise State University

1930 births
Living people
American children's writers
American science writers
Carlow University alumni
Writers from Pittsburgh
American women novelists
20th-century American novelists
21st-century American novelists
American women children's writers
Women science writers
20th-century American women writers
21st-century American women writers
Novelists from Pennsylvania
American women non-fiction writers
20th-century American non-fiction writers
21st-century American non-fiction writers